Here and Now: Letters (2008–2011) is the published collection of letters between the authors Paul Auster and J. M. Coetzee.

References

External links

http://dspace.flinders.edu.au/jspui/bitstream/2328/27102/1/Here_and_Now.pdf

2013 non-fiction books
Collections of letters
Books by Paul Auster
Works by J. M. Coetzee
Viking Press books